The Diocesan Museum is the museum of the Roman Catholic Diocese of Naples, displaying paintings, reliquaries and bronzes previously housed in the Archepiscopal Palace, closed and suppressed churches in the Diocese (such as the churches of Santa Donna Regina Nuova and the neighbouring Santa Maria Donnaregina Vecchia) or churches where it is too risky to display artworks. The paintings are mainly from the Neapolitan School, including works by Luca Giordano, Francesco Solimena, Massimo Stanzione, Aniello Falcone and Andrea Vaccaro. 

It was originally housed in the Archepiscopal Palace but due to an initiative by cardinal-archbishop Crescenzio Sepe it re-opened in the rooms behind the chancel of Santa Donna Regina Nuova and on a new mezzanine floor above the side chapels of its nave on 23 October 2007. The rooms above the side chapels are organised thematically, with a room each for the Passion of Christ, the Seven Sacraments, Martyrdom, the Life of Priests, Monks and Mendicants and the Seven Works of Pity. Other rooms house objets-d'art, such as two bronzes of St Candida of Naples and St Maximus by Giovan Domenico Vinaccia from Naples Cathedral, reliquaries, vestments and sculptures in wood and stone.

Visitors can also see the neighbouring Santa Maria Donnaregina Vecchia, although this does not display any artworks from the collection. Santa Donna Regina Nuova belongs to the Ministry of the Interior's "Collection of religious buildings", whilst the City of Naples owns Santa Maria Donnaregina Vecchia. The museum is managed by the Archdiocese and supervised by the Soprintendenza al polo museale di Napoli.

Floor plan

Collections

Paintings

Sculptures

Metalwork and reliquaries

Other

References

External links 
 

Art museums and galleries in Naples
Naples
2007 establishments in Italy